The 2000 CarsDirect.com 400 was the third stock car race of the 2000 NASCAR Winston Cup Series and the third iteration of the event. The race was held on Sunday, March 5, 2000, in North Las Vegas, Nevada at Las Vegas Motor Speedway, a  permanent D-shaped oval racetrack. The race was decreased from 267 to 148 laps due to inclement weather. At race's end, Jeff Burton, driving for Roush Racing, took the lead away from teammate Mark Martin, and lead the final 13 laps before the race would get canceled from rain. This was Burton's 12th career NASCAR Winston Cup Series win and his first of the season. To fill out the podium, Tony Stewart of Joe Gibbs Racing and Mark Martin of Roush Racing would finish second and third, respectively.

Background 

Las Vegas Motor Speedway, located in Clark County, Nevada in Las Vegas, Nevada about 15 miles northeast of the Las Vegas Strip, is a  complex of multiple tracks for motorsports racing. The complex is owned by Speedway Motorsports, Inc., which is headquartered in Charlotte, North Carolina.

Entry list 

 (R) - denotes rookie driver

Practice

First practice 
The first practice session was held on Friday, March 3, at 10:00 AM PST, and would last for three hours and 55 minutes.

Second practice 
The second practice session was held on Saturday, March 4, at 9:00 AM PST, and would last for one hour and 30 minutes.

Final practice 
The final practice session, sometimes referred to as Happy Hour, was held on Saturday, March 4, at 4:15 PM PST.

Qualifying 
Qualifying was held on Friday, March 3, at 2:00 PM PST. Each driver would have one lap to set a fastest time; and that lap would count as their official qualifying lap. Positions 1-36 would be decided on time, while positions 37-43 would be based on provisionals. Six spots are awarded by the use of provisionals based on owner's points. The seventh is awarded to a past champion who has not otherwise qualified for the race. If no past champ needs the provisional, the next team in the owner points will be awarded a provisional.

Six drivers would fail to qualify: Rick Mast, Mike Bliss, Ed Berrier, Brett Bodine, Dave Marcis, and Austin Cameron.

Full qualifying results

Race results

References 

2000 NASCAR Winston Cup Series
NASCAR races at Las Vegas Motor Speedway
March 2000 sports events in the United States
2000 in sports in Nevada